Size Zero is a 2015 Indian romantic comedy film directed by Prakash Kovelamudi and written by Kanika Dhillon. The film was simultaneously shot in Telugu and Tamil language versions, the latter titled Inji Iduppazhagi. Produced by Prasad V Potluri, the film features Anushka Shetty in the lead role while Arya, Prakash Raj, Urvashi and Sonal Chauhan play supporting roles. The film was remade in Odia as Chhati Tale Ding Dong.

Plot

Soundarya aka Sweety is an overweight, brave, independent woman. She is slightly conscious about her weight but does not let it affect her. She falls in love with Abhishek, who was once a prospective groom for her and now a friend. She later finds out that he is in love with Simran. Sweety is devastated and joins a weight loss clinic called Size Zero as she thinks that her weight is the issue. One of her friends, Jyothi, who is in the clinic with her, develops kidney problems because of the weight loss drugs given in the clinic. Sweety begins a crusade against the clinic. She is joined by Abhi and Simran. Abhi slowly starts to fall for Sweety. The rest of the movie is how Sweety triumphs in her crusade and gets her Prince Charming back.

Cast

 Anushka Shetty as Soundarya 'Sweety' (Voice by Sowmya Sharma in Telugu, and by Deepa Venkat in Tamil)
 Arya as Abhishek 'Abhi'
 Prakash Raj as 'Size Zero' Satyanand
 Sonal Chauhan as Simran
 Pavani Gangireddy as Jyothi
 Urvashi as Rajeswari
 Adivi Sesh as Sekhar
 Brahmanandam as Android Baba (guest appearance)
 Ali as Bobby
 Gollapudi Maruti Rao as Mouli Thatha
 Rao Ramesh as Sweety's father
 Tanikella Bharani as Doctor
 Posani Krishna Murali as Nijam Niranjan
 Master Bharath as Yahoo
 Hema as Neeraja
 Sivannarayana Naripeddi as Gym instructor
 Viva Harsha as Sweety's fan
 Angela Krislinzki as an item number in title song

Cameo appearances as themselves
Arranged in alphabetical order

 Bobby Simha 
 Hansika Motwani
 Jiiva 
 Kajal Aggarwal 
 Lakshmi Manchu
 Nagarjuna 
 Raju Sundaram
 Rana Daggubati
 Revathi
 Sri Divya
 Tamannaah

Production
In February 2015, Prasad V Potluri announced a new bilingual film venture titled Size Zero, to be directed by Prakash Kovelamudi, which would star Arya and Anushka Shetty. Nirav Shah and M. M. Keeravani were signed on as cinematographer and music composer respectively, while the script was announced to be written by Prakash's wife Kanika. Shruti Haasan was reported to be making an extended guest appearance, while Urvashi and Master Bharath also formed the principal cast. The Tamil version of the film began shoot in March 2015, after a launch ceremony in Chennai. Shruti Haasan soon left the project citing differences with the producers, after a conflict during the making of another film with them. Though it was suggested that she would instead perform an item number in the film instead, she also refuted the claims.

After talks with other actress to replace her including Esha Gupta, Sonal Chauhan subsequently joined the team to play the second female lead role in April 2015. Nagarjuna enacted a guest appearance in the film during the shoot in May 2015, while Jiiva was signed to make a special appearance as well. Dubbing voice for Arya in Telugu was provided by actor Nandu.

Anushka prepared for her role in the film by putting on weight to portray her character.

After shooting several schedules, in early July 2015 some important crucial romantic scenes were being shot between Arya and Shetty at Ramoji Film City in Hyderabad. On 18 July 2015 makers released a press statement stating that the film's shoot was completed.

Soundtrack

Music is composed by M. M. Keeravani. On 31 August 2015, a teaser was released in which the audio release date was stated as 6 September 2015. But, due to unknown reasons makers postponed the audio launch. Behindwoods rated the album 2.75 out of 5 and called it "a Lightweight" album from Keeravani!".

Release
Makers announced the worldwide release date as 2 October 2015 coinciding Gandhi Jayanti. Later, makers postponed the release date to 21 October 2015. They again postponed the release date to 27 November 2015 Prior to the release, Sonal Chauhan, who plays an NRI in the movie, described the movie as a "story with a lot of heart and made by a team of people who sincerely felt for it."

Reception

Size Zero
Pranita Jonnalagedda of Times of India rated the film 3 out of 5 and wrote, "Size Zero is slow at times and can go into a sermon mode but then it packs some moments which will make you laugh out loud." Suresh Kavirayani of Deccan Chronicle called the film, "A good concept gone horribly wrong."

Inji Iduppazhagi
Behindwoods gave the film 2.25 out of 5 and concluded, "See it for Anushka and a few good moments". Indiaglitz gave 2.75 out of 5 saying, "After watching 'Inji Idupazhagi', you will leave the movie hall with a smile and satisfaction." Baradwaj Rangan of the Hindu called it "Lots of minuses in this story of a plus-sized woman" in his review and criticized the film's dubbing.

References

External links
 

2015 films
2010s Tamil-language films
2010s Telugu-language films
Indian romantic comedy films
Films shot at Ramoji Film City
Indian multilingual films
Films scored by M. M. Keeravani
2015 romantic comedy films
Telugu films remade in other languages
2015 multilingual films
Films directed by Prakash Kovelamudi